Banca Unione di Credito is a full-service bank based in Lugano, Switzerland, that specialises in private banking.

History
1919 Credito Italiano established Banca Unione di Credito in Switzerland.
1947 The Fiat Group acquired the entire share capital to make BUC its house bank.
1984 BUC established a subsidiary in Zurich.
1990 BUC established a representative office in Argentina.
1991 BUC established a subsidiary in Geneva.
1993 BUC acquired Overland Bank, also based in Lugano, and doubled in size.
1994 BUC established a subsidiary, Banca Unione di Credito (Cayman), Grand Cayman.
1995 BUC held about 8% of a stockbroker and fund management bank (SIM) in Turin, Banca Patrimoni e Investimenti, which is the result of the merger of Gestnord Intermediazione SIM and Sella Investimenti Banca.
2002 BUC acquired a 26% stake in Lombard Bank Malta plc, Valletta, the third largest bank in Malta, to become Lombard's largest shareholder.
2006 Banca della Svizzera Italiana (BSI) acquired Banca Unione di Credito. BSI is also based in Lugano and is a subsidiary of the Italian insurer Assicurazioni Generali. Fiat sold BUC both to raise capital and to focus on its core automotive business.

External links

BSI home page: http://www.bsibank.com/

Banks of Switzerland
Banks established in 1919
Swiss companies established in 1919